The Gunwinyguan languages (Gunwinjguan, Gunwingguan), also core Gunwinyguan or Gunwinyguan proper, are a possible branch of a large language family of Australian Aboriginal languages in Arnhem Land, northern Australia. The most populous language is Kunwinjku, with some 1500 speakers.

Gunwinyguan languages have a fortis–lenis contrast in plosive consonants. Lenis/short plosives have weak contact and intermittent voicing, while fortis/long plosives have full closure, a more powerful release burst, and no voicing.

Languages
The list here is based on Green (2003).  However, Green believes the similarities among these languages are due to shared retentions from Proto-Arnhem, and are not indicative of an exclusive relationship between them.

Gunwinggic: Kunwinjku (Gunwinggu), Kunbarlang
Jawoyn (Djauan)
Dalabon (Ngalkbun)
Jala (Rembarngic): Rembarrnga, Ngalakgan
Warrayic: Waray, Uwinymil

Yangmanic had once been included, but has been removed from recent classifications. Various other languages appear to be related to this Gunwinyguan core. This larger family is sometimes also called Gunwinyguan, but more unambiguously Macro-Gunwinyguan or Arnhem.

References

 
Language families